Hugh William Williams FRSE (1773–1829), known as "Grecian Williams," was a Scottish landscape painter.

Life
Williams was born onboard the ship of his father, Captain Williams, whilst en route to the West Indies. His mother, "Miss Lewis", died in 1782, and his father, being unable to care for the nine-year-old Hugh, left him in the care of Louis Ruffini, a textile manufacturer in Dalkeith. Ruffini encouraged Hugh to become a painter. For some years he concentrated on Highland landscapes.

An extended tour in Italy and Greece, from which he returned in 1818, was funded by the then-recently unseated Member of Parliament William Douglas, an amateur artist, who also accompanied him. The tour gave his work its particular character, and earned him the nickname "Grecian Williams". In 1822 Williams held an exhibition of watercolours, based on his tour. It was a critical success, its ruins and famous scenes of Greek history chiming with the taste of the time.

Williams was an original member of the Associated Artists in Watercolour (1808), with Andrew Wilson, which was short-lived; and an associate of the Royal Institution, Edinburgh. Towards the end of his life he took an interest in the proposed amalgamation of the Scottish Academy and the artist associates of the Institution, an arrangement which was completed a month after his death.

He was elected a Fellow of the Royal Society of Edinburgh in 1823 his proposer being Sir David Brewster.

He died at home, 65 Castle Street in Edinburgh's First New Townon 23 June 1829. He is buried in Canongate Kirkyard in the lair of his in-laws, the Millars of Earnock. His wife Robina Millar died in 1874. The grave lies in the eastern extension, adjacent to the link to the main churchyard.

Works

Williams was active since the early 1790s with the earliest recorded work dated 1792. In 1802 an engraving after a painting by him of Hermitage Castle, Roxburghshire, as the frontispiece for Sir Walter Scott's "Minstrelsy of the Scottish Border" was published by Kelso. 
In 1811–12, Williams published six large engravings of scenes in the north, while many of his early topographical drawings appeared in the Scots Magazine. An account of his travels in southern Europe, in two volumes, appeared in 1820. Written in the form of letters, and dedicated to John Thomson of Duddingston, the intention of the work was descriptive of scenery, and peoples as they appeared to him. The illustrations were engraved by William Home Lizars from drawings by the author.

Between 1827 and 1829, Williams published Select Views in Greece in numbers, each containing six plates. While he painted some oil pictures, he mostly used watercolour, in broad washes of transparent colour over a careful pencil design. His work was acquired by the National Gallery of Scotland and South Kensington Museum. More works can be found in the public collections of Amsterdam Rijksmuseum, Athens Benaki Museum, Birkenhead Williamson Art Gallery, Birmingham Museum, Cambridge Fitwilliam Museum, Cardiff National Museum of Wales, Dublin National Museum, National Galleries of Scotland, The British Museum, Victoria and Albert Museum, and many other galleries. Research by The Fine Art Society shows most of his works from Greece are held in that country.

Family
Shortly after his return from the Middle East in 1827, Williams married the wealthy Miss Robina Miller of Garnock. The couple was active and popular in Edinburgh high society. They had no children. In 1829, Williams died after a severe bout of illness that had afflicted him since the previous year. He was buried in the Miller plot in the Cannongate churchyard, Edinburgh on 22 June. Robina and the other trustees, Aeneas MacBean WS, and the miniaturist painter William John Thomson RSA, arranged a studio sale in 1831.

Notes

External links

Life and Works of Hugh William Williams by Joe Rock 1996
 
Attribution
 

 

1773 births
1829 deaths
Scottish watercolourists
Scottish landscape artists
19th-century Scottish painters
Scottish male painters
Burials at the Canongate Kirkyard
People born at sea
19th-century Scottish male artists